Peter de Bermingham was the Anglo-Irish second lord of Athenry who died c. 1309.

Peter was a son of Meyler, who founded the town of Athenry in Clann Taidg, County Galway. His eldest son, Myler, died in 1302 without male issue so the lordship devolved to the younger son, Rickard de Bermingham. 

He seems to have been regarded by the English Crown as a reliable subject. A statute of the Irish Parliament of 1299 provided for him to be given extra troops to deal with "the Irish felons".

Myler's widow Joan remarried the prominent English-born judge Sir John de Fressingfield. She brought a lawsuit against Peter over her dower, which included Knockgraffon Castle in County Tipperary. Her date of death is not recorded: Sir John, who had returned to England, was still alive in 1322.

References
 "The Abbey of Athenry", Martin J. Blake, Journal of the Galway Archaeological and Historical Society, volume II, part ii, 1902
 "The Birmingham Family of Athenry", H. T. Knox, J.G.A.H.S., volume ten, numbers iii and iv, 1916–17.
 "The Birmingham Chalice", J. Rabbitte, J.G.A.H.S., volume 17, i and ii, 1936-27
 "The Second Battle of Athenry", Adrian James Martyn, East Galway News & Views, September 2008 – April 2009

External links
 Medieval Ireland: an encyclopedia
 Edenderry Historical Society
 The Fitzgeralds: Barons of Offaly

Irish soldiers
13th-century Irish people
People from County Galway
Normans in Ireland
People from Athenry
Barons Athenry
Peter
1300s deaths